Laurent Landi (born 18 October 1977) is a French-American artistic gymnastics coach and retired gymnast. He was formerly a coach at the World Olympic Gymnastics Academy until 2017, when he began working at the World Champions Centre as the Women's Team director as well as serving as the head coach to Simone Biles. Landi has previously coached world and Olympic champion Madison Kocian and world champion Alyssa Baumann.

Career
Landi was a member of the French national team in gymnastics. He trained at the Olympic Antibes Juan-les-Pins Club in Antibes, France. He placed 12th in the all-around and won the bronze medal on high bar at the 1994 Junior European Championships.

Coaching career
Following his competitive career, in 1999, Landi started coaching at his club in Antibes. Landi coached there until 2002, when he began working at the French National Gymnastics training center in Marseille, France. In 2004, he moved to Norman, Oklahoma, with his future wife, Cecile. In Oklahoma, Landi was a coach at the Bart Conner Gymnastics Academy. Since 2007, he has worked at the World Olympic Gymnastics Academy. Landi has worked with accomplished gymnasts such as Alyssa Baumann, Madison Kocian, Briley Casanova, Samantha Ogden, and Sophia Lee.
In 2017, Landi moved from WOGA to the World Champions Centre, where he is currently head coach to Simone Biles.

Personal life
Landi lives in McKinney, Texas, with his wife, Cecile, a gymnastics coach and Olympian (1996), and daughter, Juliette Elvire Landi (born 2007), a competitive gymnast.

References

1977 births
Living people
French male artistic gymnasts
French people of Italian descent
French emigrants to the United States
American people of Italian descent
American gymnastics coaches
People from McKinney, Texas
World Olympic Gymnastics Academy